Joaquín Larroya (7 October 1937 – 14 April 2021) was a Spanish sprint canoer who competed in the early 1960s. At the 1960 Summer Olympics in Rome, he was eliminated in the semifinals of both the K-1 1000 m and K-2 1000 m events.

References

Joaquín Larroya's profile at Sports Reference.com
Joaquín Larroya's obituary 

1937 births
2021 deaths
Canoeists at the 1960 Summer Olympics
Olympic canoeists of Spain
Spanish male canoeists